Trukhaniv Ostriv is a station currently under construction on the Kyiv Metro's Podilsko-Vyhurivska Line. The station is part of the first segment of the Podilsko-Vyhurivska Line, which is scheduled to be completed after 2022. Construction works at the station are suspended as of June 2020. An opening date of no earlier than 2025 has been set.

History
The station is located on the northern part of the Trukhaniv Ostriv (for which it is named), an island on the Dnipro River. It is being built concurrently with the Podilskyi Metro Bridge, under which it is located. It will be located in between the Sudnobudivna and Zatoka Desenka stations, all three of which will be built according to the same architectural principles.

The station will be enclosed with transparent glass on the outside, to protect passengers from the weathers elements. On the exterior, the station will have only one station vestibule, with a parking lot for the station's workers included.

References

Proposed Kyiv Metro stations
Transport on Trukhaniv Island